Oakhanger may refer to more than one place in England:
 Oakhanger, Cheshire
 Oakhanger, Hampshire

See also
RAF Oakhanger